Vieira da Silva is a large crater on Mercury. Its name was adopted by the International Astronomical Union (IAU) in 2013. The crater is named for the Portuguese abstract painter Maria Helena Vieira da Silva.

The small, rayed crater Mena lies within Vieira da Silva.  To the west are Thoreau and Lysippus craters.

References

Impact craters on Mercury